Melemaea is a genus of moths in the family Geometridae described by George Duryea Hulst in 1896.

Species
Melemaea magdalena Hulst, 1896
Melemaea virgata Taylor, 1906

References

Ourapterygini